Mountain Home is an unincorporated community and census-designated place (CDP) in Henderson County, North Carolina, United States. The population was 3,622 at the 2010 census, up from 2,169 in 2000. It is part of the Asheville Metropolitan Statistical Area.

Geography
Mountain Home is located in north-central Henderson County at  (35.370015, -82.502173). It is bordered to the south by Balfour and to the northeast by Mud Creek, a tributary of the French Broad River. North Carolina Highway 191 forms the southwestern edge of the CDP. US 25 Business leads south  to Hendersonville.

Demographics

2020 census

As of the 2020 United States census, there were 3,490 people, 1,709 households, and 1,051 families residing in the CDP.

2000 census
As of the census of 2000, there were 2,169 people, 906 households, and 656 families residing in the CDP. The population density was 816.9 people per square mile (314.8/km2). There were 993 housing units at an average density of 374.0 per square mile (144.1/km2). The racial makeup of the CDP was 95.71% White, 1.15% African American, 0.55% Native American, 0.83% Asian, 0.14% Pacific Islander, 0.14% from other races, and 1.48% from two or more races. Hispanic or Latino of any race were 3.18% of the population.

There were 906 households, out of which 25.7% had children under the age of 18 living with them, 59.7% were married couples living together, 9.2% had a female householder with no husband present, and 27.5% were non-families. 23.1% of all households were made up of individuals, and 8.8% had someone living alone who was 65 years of age or older. The average household size was 2.38 and the average family size was 2.75.

In the CDP, the population was spread out, with 20.4% under the age of 18, 6.0% from 18 to 24, 26.2% from 25 to 44, 26.2% from 45 to 64, and 21.1% who were 65 years of age or older. The median age was 43 years. For every 100 females, there were 100.1 males. For every 100 females age 18 and over, there were 96.1 males.

The median income for a household in the CDP was $41,042, and the median income for a family was $50,648. Males had a median income of $30,662 versus $22,011 for females. The per capita income for the CDP was $22,829. About 4.7% of families and 9.2% of the population were below the poverty line, including 7.9% of those under age 18 and 12.9% of those age 65 or over.

References

Census-designated places in Henderson County, North Carolina
Census-designated places in North Carolina
Asheville metropolitan area